Verone McKinley III (born June 29, 2000) is an American football safety for the Miami Dolphins of the National Football League (NFL). He played college football at Oregon.

High school career
McKinley attended Hebron High School in Carrollton, Texas. He committed to the University of Oregon to play college football.

College career
As a true freshman at Oregon in 2018, McKinley played in three games before taking a redshirt. As a redshirt freshman in 2019, he started 11 of 14 games, recording 46 tackles and four interceptions. In 2020, he started six of seven games and had 46 tackles and one interception. McKinley 2021 season at Oregon he earned first-team Consensus All-American and first-team All-Pac 12 honors as a junior in 2021. He started all 14 games that seasons, recording 78 tackles (44 solo), six interceptions, 12 passes defensed and one forced fumble. In McKinley's collegiate career, he recorded 11 interceptions in 38 games.
 McKinley was a three-year starter (2019-2021). He was named a finalist for the Jim Thorpe Award.

Professional career

McKinley signed with the Miami Dolphins as an undrafted free agent on May 13, 2022. He was waived by the Dolphins on August 30, 2022, and re-signed to the practice squad. He was promoted to the active roster on November 12.  On November 27, he recorded his first career interception in a 30-15 win over the Houston Texans.

References

External links
 Miami Dolphins bio
Oregon Ducks bio

Living people
Players of American football from Texas
American football safeties
Oregon Ducks football players
All-American college football players
Miami Dolphins players
2000 births